Corricella is a port on Procida in the Phlegraean Islands off the coast of Naples in southern Italy. It is known for its vibrantly colorful housing.

Tourism Popularity

The Telegraph in 2017 listed Corricella as the 11th of Italy's 19 most-beautiful villages.  According to TheLocal.it, "...you can wander down the hill and into the colorful port of Corricella, where each house is painted in a different pastel shade."

Tourist writer Nick Bruno mentions Corricella in 2013, describing "a fine spot for absorbing the picturesque Corricella harbor scene." Corricella is "the most characteristic spot" on Procida according to the Rough Guides travel series.

Popular Culture

Corricella was the setting for the waterfront scenes in the Academy Award-winning movie Il Postino (The Postman) (1995).

References

External links
 Wikimedia Image Gallery for Corricella

Geography of Campania